Events from the year 1877 in Scotland.

Incumbents

Law officers 
 Lord Advocate – William Watson
 Solicitor General for Scotland – John Macdonald

Judiciary 
 Lord President of the Court of Session and Lord Justice General – Lord Glencorse
 Lord Justice Clerk – Lord Moncreiff

Events 
 24 April – six Scotch whisky distilleries combine to form Distillers Company.
 16 October – the Abertay light vessel is moored on station off Dundee, Scotland's first lightvessel.
 22 October – Blantyre mining disaster: Scotland's worst-ever mining accident kills over 200.
 3 December – the original Mount Stuart House on the Isle of Bute is burned down.
 Ex-President of the United States Ulysses S. Grant tours his ancestral Scotland.
 The rebuilt Ardverikie House in Badenoch, designed by John Rhind, is completed.
 Cluny Harbour at Buckie is built.
 Wick Harbour breakwater is washed away in a storm for a second time.
 Mitchell Library established in Glasgow.
 Manufacture of linoleum at Kirkcaldy begins.
 Separate U.K. Ayrshire cattle and Galloway cattle societies established and herd books set up.
 A breed register for the Clydesdale horse is established.

Births 
 25 February – John Tait Robertson, international footballer (died 1935)
 12 May – William Weir, 1st Viscount Weir, industrialist and politician (died 1959)
 7 August – Leslie Hunter, born George Hunter, painter (died 1931)
 9 November – Helen Crawfurd, suffragette and communist activist (died 1954)
 26 November – Sir John Stewart, 1st Baronet, of Fingask, whisky distiller (suicide 1924)

Deaths 
 2 January – Alexander Bain, inventor (born 1810)
 3 February – James Merry, ironmaster, race-horse breeder and Liberal MP (1859–74) (born 1805)
 14 April – Margaret Macpherson Grant, heiress and philanthropist (born 1834)

The arts
 William McGonagall discovers himself to be a poet (according to his own account).
 Robert Louis Stevenson's first published works of fiction appear in magazines.

See also 
 Timeline of Scottish history
 1877 in the United Kingdom

References 

 
Years of the 19th century in Scotland
Scotland
1870s in Scotland